is a monorail route of the Osaka Monorail which connects Osaka Airport Station in Toyonaka, Osaka Prefecture, Senri-Chūō Station in Suita, Minami-Ibaraki Station in Ibaraki, Dainichi Station in Moriguchi, and Kadoma-shi Station in Kadoma.

Overview
The Main Line runs on an elevated line between Osaka International Airport and Kadoma. On September 30, 1994 it reached Shibahara-handai-mae Station, on April 1, 1997, and on August 22, 1997, its current eastern terminal at Kadoma-shi Station. A single-way trip over the entire Main Line takes about 36 minutes, and costs ¥550.

An 8.9-km, five-station extension from Kadoma to Uryudo is planned to open in 2029.

Station list

Notes

External links
 Osaka Monorail official website 

Monorails in Japan
Airport rail links in Japan
Alweg people movers
Railway lines opened in 1990
1990 establishments in Japan
Rail transport in Osaka Prefecture